Albert Renaud may refer to:

 Albert Renaud (1855−1924), French organist and composer
 Albert Renaud (1920−2021), Canadian ice hockey player